Khalid (variants include Khaled and Kalid; Arabic: خالد) is a popular Arabic male given name meaning "eternal, everlasting, immortal", and it also appears as a surname.

Notable persons

Politics and military
 Khalid of Saudi Arabia (1913–1982), the fourth king of Saudi Arabia
 Khalid bin Mohammed Al Angari (born 1952), Saudi politician
 Khaled al-Attiyah (born 1949), Iraqi politician
 Khalid Bakdash (1912–1995), former leader of the Syrian Communist Party
 Khalid ibn Barmak (705–782), first prominent member of the Barmakid family
 Khalid Al Hud Al Gargani, Libyan royal advisor in Saudi Arabia
 Khaled al-Harbi (born 1963), associate of Osama Bin Laden
 Khalid Ibrahim (born 1946), Malaysian politician
 Khalid Islambouli (1955–1982), assassinated Egyptian president Anwar Sadat
Khaled Kelkal, soldier in the Armed Islamic group of Algeria; he was also responsible for carrying out some bombings in France
 Khalid ibn Ahmad Al Khalifah (1960–), current Foreign Minister of Bahrain
 Khaled Mashal (born 1956), member of Hamas
 Khalid El-Masri (born 1963), German citizen detained and interrogated by the CIA
 Khalid al-Mihdhar (1975–2001), Saudi hijacker in the September 11 attacks
 Khaled Mosharraf (1937–1975), Bangladeshi war hero
 Khalid Abdul Muhammad (1948–2001), former Nation of Islam member and Black Nationalist
 Khalid Sheikh Mohammed (born 1964), terrorist claimed to be responsible for masterminding the September 11 attacks
 Khaled Qasim, Yemeni citizen detained in Guantanamo Bay
 Khalid bin Mohammed Al Qasimi (1931–1972), assassinated ruler of Sharjah in the United Arab Emirates
 Khaled Ben Mustapha (born 1972), former detainee at Guantanamo Bay Naval Base
 Khalid al-Qasri (died 743), Umayyad governor of Mecca and Iraq
 Khalid Raad, Syrian economist and politician
 Khalid bin Abdullah Al Saud (1937–2021), Saudi royal
 Khaled bin Abdullah Al Saud (born 1950), Saudi royal
 Khalid bin Bandar Al Saud (born 1951), Saudi royal
 Khalid ibn al-Walid (died 642), Muslim military commander in the service of the Rashidun Caliphate

Film, television, theatre
 Khalid Abdalla (born 1988), British actor
 Khalid Gonçalves (born 1971), American actor
 Khaled El Sayed, Lebanese actor and voice actor

Music
 DJ Khaled (born 1975), American DJ, record producer and radio personality
 Khaled (musician) (born 1960), formerly known as Cheb Khaled, Algerian raï musician
 Khalid (singer) (born 1998), American singer and songwriter
 Nazim Khaled, French singer, songwriter and composer

Sports
 Khaled Badra (born 1973), Tunisian football player
 Khalid Boulahrouz (born 1981), Dutch football player
 Khaled Fadhel (born 1976), Tunisian football player
 Khalid Kareem (born 1998), American football player
 Khalid Khan (born 1971), Hong Kong cricketer
 Khalid Khannouchi (born 1971), Moroccan American marathoner
 Khalid Lachheb (born 1975), French pole vaulter
 Khaled Mahmud (born 1971), Bangladeshi cricket player
 Khaled Mashud (born 1976), Bangladeshi cricket player
 Khaled Mouelhi (born 1981), Tunisian football player
 Khalidou Sissokho (born 1978), Senegalese footballer
 Khalid Skah (born 1967), Moroccan athlete

Other
 Khalid (1930-1994), Indian novelist in Malayalam-language
 Khaled bin Sinan (pre-7th century), historic figure of pre-Islamic Arabia, and a disputed prophet in Islam
 Khalid bin Mahfouz (1949-2009), Saudi Arabian businessman suspected of having links to terrorism
 Khaled Abou Al-Fadl (born 1963),  professor at the UCLA School of Law
 Khaled Abu Toameh (born 1963), Israeli journalist
 Khalid Adem (born 1975), American convict
 Khalid Amayreh (born 1957), Palestinian journalist
 Khâlid-i Baghdâdî, Ottoman mystic founding the Khalidi branch of the Naqshbandi Sufi order  
 Khaled Hosseini (born 1965), Afghan-American physician and author
 Khalid ibn Yazid, seventh century alchemist
 Khaled Mardam-Bey, creator of mIRC
 Khaled bin Alwaleed Al Saud (born 1978), Saudi entrepreneur and royal
 Khalid bin Talal Al Saud (born 1962), Saudi royal and businessman
 Khalid Sharrouf (born 1981), Australian Arab hate speaker and terror suspect

Middle name
 Ahmad Khaled Towfeq (1962-2018), Egyptian novelist

Surname
 Aisha Khalid (born 1972), Pakistani artist
 Amr Khaled (born 1967), Islamic preacher
 Hassan Khaled (1921-1989), former leader of Lebanon's Sunni Muslim community
 Leila Khaled (born 1944), former member of the Popular Front for the Liberation of Palestine
 Waleed Khaled (died 2005), journalist killed by American soldiers during the Iraq War

Notable animals
Khaled (horse), a Thoroughbred racehorse
Khaled 5, an Arabian horse noted as a major sire in the early 1900s.

References

Arabic masculine given names
Arabic-language surnames
Bosniak masculine given names